Aaadonta angaurana is a small air-breathing land snail, a terrestrial pulmonate gastropod mollusc in the family Endodontidae.

Distribution
This species is endemic to Angaur in the Palau Islands, as all members of the genus Aaadonta are endemic to Palau.  It is known only from one locality, where it was last found in 1936. None have been found recently and they might be extinct.

Notes

References
Endodontoid land snails from Pacific Islands (Mollusca : Pulmonata : Sigmurethra). Alan Solem ... ; [collab.] Barbara K. Solem. Chicago, Ill. :Field Museum of Natural History,1976.
Endodontoid land snails from Pacific Islands (Mollusca : Pulmonata : Sigmurethra). Alan Solem. Chicago :Field museum of Natural History,1982.

External links
 biodiversity.mongabay.com
uBio
Organism Names

Endodontidae
Gastropods described in 1976
Endemic fauna of Palau